Princess of Power (sometimes abbreviated as POP and informally referred to as She-Ra, after the lead heroine) is a toyline created by Mattel. Among others, it features the characters of She-Ra and Catra on planet Etheria. With its launch in 1984, the toyline spawned a variety of products, including three lines of fashion action figures. The Princess of Power logo and characters are currently used by Mattel as part of the Masters of the Universe Classics toyline.

The Toys
In 1984, Mattel and Filmation decided to diversify the Masters of the Universe line beyond its traditional realm of "male action" in the hopes of bringing in a young female audience as well. To accompany the Filmation animated series, Mattel created a new line of toys aimed at girls - Princess of Power - with the feminine warrior-woman She-Ra as its main heroine. The toyline featured almost exclusively female characters, all of whom featured an emphasis on hair and clothing, with "real" hair and partially soft-goods costumes. Essentially, the line attempted to fuse the appeal of Masters of the Universe with Mattel's most long-standing success, Barbie. Like its predecessor Masters of the Universe, the POP toy line actually lasted longer than the She-Ra: Princess of Power cartoon series itself.

Mattel Princess of Power Vintage Toys (1984-1987)

Mattel Princess of Power Unreleased Toys (1985-1987)
The following appear in toy catalogues but were never released.

Cartoon Series (1985-87)

The animated series She-Ra: Princess of Power was produced by Filmation and made its television debut in 1985.

Etheria is ruled by Hordak and the Evil Horde. Raised by Hordak, but actually the long-lost daughter of King Randor and Queen Marlena of Eternia, and twin sister of Prince Adam / He-Man, Princess Adora joins the Great Rebellion to fight against the oppressive Horde. Princess Adora possesses a magic sword, and when she holds it aloft with her right hand and says the magic words, "For the honor of Grayskull... I AM SHE-RA!!!" she is transformed into She-Ra, "The Most Powerful Woman in the Universe." She-Ra is a beautiful blonde woman dressed in a white dress and a red cape, with a golden tiara on her head.

Mattel Masters of the Universe 200X
Only one Princess of Power character was redone as an action figure for the new Masters of the Universe line in 2002-04: She-Ra, herself.

Released as an exclusive in 2004, this new She-Ra figure was made to appeal to fans of both the original and the new toylines, as well as fit in more closely with the other redesigned Masters characters. The new She-Ra still had the rooted, combable hair, but all of her clothing (except for her cape) was made out of molded plastic instead of cloth (unlike the original fashion action figure, who had both a cloth cape and skirt).

Mattel/Super7 Masters of the Universe Classics (2008-2020)

This new line of collector-oriented figures features previously released characters with "classic" retro sculpting and levels of articulation unprecedented for Masters of the Universe toys, and exclusively available online from Mattel's website mattycollector.com. As with the 200X toyline they are once again sculpted by the Four Horsemen, but are predominantly based on the original 1980's line of figures. Super7 took over the manufacture of the line in 2017, under licence from Mattel. The line plans to eventually include characters from all aspects of the Masters of the Universe franchise, including She-Ra (Princess of Power).

The first Princess of Power figure was Princess Adora, as revealed at the 2009 San Diego Comic Con, and was first made available in January 2010. Since then, Adora's alter-ego She-Ra has been released in the Classics line along with Princess of Power male lead Bow and chief villainess Catra. Although they made their original toy appearances in Masters of the Universe, She-Ra villains Hordak, Leech, Mantenna and Grizzlor are also available.  New additions to the line from Princess of Power included Bubble Power She-Ra and her beloved steed Swift Wind, and many more characters were released during the following years.

In 2017 Super7 took over the production of Masters of the Universe Classics and released two more characters from Princess of Power, Granita and Dylamug.

Super7 He-Man and the Masters of the Universe (2017-2019)
In 2017 Super7 took over the production of the He-Man and the Masters of the Universe 7" scale toyline. Included for the first time are cartoon-accurate Hordak and Tung Lashor figures from the She-Ra animated series.

Super7 Vintage-style Masters of the Universe (2018-2019)
In 2018 Super7 released new action figures in the style of the original 5.5 inch Mattel MOTU toys, including characters from the She-Ra: Princess of Power cartoon.

Mattel Princess of Power 2016 Exclusive

In July 2016 Mattel released a new 11 inch She-Ra doll. Exclusively available from MattyCollector, she has rooted hair, includes 3 fabric outfits (Filmation, Classic Toy, and Adora), 2 Swords of Protection, and comes with a mini-comic.

References

 
1980s toys
Fashion dolls
Masters of the Universe
Mattel